Bishnupur Assembly constituency is an assembly constituency in Bankura district in the Indian state of West Bengal.

Overview
As per orders of the Delimitation Commission, No. 255 Bishnupur Assembly constituency is composed of the following: Bishnupur municipality; Bishnupur community development block; and Amdangra, Saltora and Satmauli gram panchayats of Taldangra community development block.

Bishnupur Assembly constituency is part of No. 37 Bishnupur (Lok Sabha constituency).

Members of Legislative Assembly

Election results
2016

In the 2016 West Bengal Assembly Election, the Left-Cong candidate Tushar Kanti Bhattacharya defeated Shyam Mukherjee ( who was then a member of TMC) by less than 1000 votes. Though later Tusharkanti Bhattacharya joined TMC.

2011

.# Swing calculated on Congress+Trinamool Congress vote percentages taken together in 2006.

1977-2006
In the 2006 state assembly elections, Swapan Ghosh of CPI(M) won the Bishnupur seat defeating his nearest rival Subhasis Batabayal of Trinamool Congress. Contests in most years were multi cornered but only winners and runners are being mentioned. Jayanta Chowdhury of CPI(M) defeated Subhasis Batabayal of Trinamool Congress in 2001 and Buddhadeb Mukherjee of Congress in 1996. Achintya Krishna Ray of CPI(M) defeated Subhasis Batabayal of Congress in 1991, Shyama Prasad Mukherjee of Congress in 1987, Sabyasachi Roy of Congress in 1982 and Ardhendu Mitra of Congress in 1977.

1952-1972
Bhabataran Chakravarty of Congress won in 1972 and 1971. Sasthidas Sarkar of Bangla Congress won in 1969. B.C.Mandal of Congress won in 1967. Radhika Dhibar of CPI won in 1962. In 1957 and 1952 the Bishnupur seat was a dual one. Purabi Mukhopadhyay and Kiran Chandra Digar, both of Congress, won in 1957. Kiran Chandra Digar and Radha Gobinda Roy, both of Congress, won in independent India's first election in 1952.

References

Assembly constituencies of West Bengal
Politics of Bankura district